In religion, a false prophet is a person who falsely claims the gift of prophecy or divine inspiration, or to speak for God, or who makes such claims for evil ends. Often, someone who is considered a "true prophet" by some people is simultaneously considered a "false prophet" by others, even within the same religion as the "prophet" in question. In a wider sense, it is anyone who, without having it, claims a special connection to the deity and sets him or herself up as a source of spirituality, as an authority, preacher, or teacher. Analogously, the term is sometimes applied outside religion to describe someone who fervently promotes a theory that the speaker thinks is false.

Christianity

Christian eschatology originated with the public life and preaching of Jesus. Throughout the New Testament and some of the early Christian apocryphal writings, Jesus warns his disciples and apostles multiple times of both false prophets and false Messiahs, and believers are frequently adjured to beware of them and stay vigilant.

Gospels
In the Sermon on the Mount (Matthew ), Jesus warns his followers of false prophets:

"Beware of false prophets, who come to you in sheep's clothing but inwardly are ravenous wolves. You will know them by their fruits. Are grapes gathered from thorns, or figs from thistles? So, every sound tree bears good fruit, but the bad tree bears evil fruit. A sound tree cannot bear evil fruit, nor can a bad tree bear good fruit. Every tree that does not bear good fruit is cut down and thrown into the fire. Thus you will know them by their fruits."

The canonical gospels address the same point of a false prophet predicting correctly, and Jesus predicted the future appearance of false Christs and false prophets, affirming that they can perform great signs and miracles, for example, in the Olivet Discourse given on the Mount of Olives:

"And Jesus began to say to them, “Take heed that no one leads you astray. Many will come in my name, saying, I am he! and they will lead many astray. And when you hear of wars and rumors of wars, do not be alarmed; this must take place, but the end is not yet. [...] And then if any one says to you, Look, here is the Christ! or Look, there he is! do not believe it. False Christs and false prophets will arise and show signs and wonders, to lead astray, if possible, the elect. But take heed; I have told you all things beforehand”." (Mark)
"Take heed that no one leads you astray. For many will come in my name, saying, I am the Christ, and they will lead many astray. [...] And many false prophets will arise and lead many astray. [...] Then if any one says to you, Lo, here is the Christ! or There he is!, do not believe it. For false Christs and false prophets will arise and show great signs and wonders, so as to lead astray, if possible, even the elect. Lo, I have told you beforehand. So, if they say to you, Lo, he is in the wilderness, do not go out; if they say, Lo, he is in the inner rooms, do not believe it." (Matthew ,)

In the Gospel of Luke, Jesus brought out an ethical application for his disciples using the analogy of false prophets in the Old Testament:

"Woe to you, when all men speak well of you, for so their fathers did to the false prophets." (Luke )

Acts and Epistles
In the Book of Acts, the apostles Paul and Barnabas encountered a false prophet named Elymas Bar-Jesus on the island of Cyprus:

 "When they had gone through the whole island as far as Paphos, they came upon a certain magician, a Jewish false prophet, named Bar-Jesus. He was with the proconsul, Sergius Paulus, a man of intelligence, who summoned Barnabas and Saul and sought to hear the word of God. But Elymas the magician (for that is the meaning of his name) withstood them, seeking to turn away the proconsul from the faith. But Saul, who is also called Paul, filled with the Holy Spirit, looked intently at him and said, “You son of the devil, you enemy of all righteousness, full of all deceit and villainy, will you not stop making crooked the straight paths of the Lord? And now, behold, the hand of the Lord is upon you, and you shall be blind and unable to see the sun for a time.” Immediately mist and darkness fell upon him and he went about seeking people to lead him by the hand. Then the proconsul believed, when he saw what had occurred, for he was astonished at the teaching of the Lord." (Acts )

This particular story likewise best matches the model found in Deuteronomy. The claim here is that Elymas is trying to turn Sergius Paulus from the true faith, just like the false prophet described in the preceding verses. In these verses, we do not see Elymas prophesying as the term is popularly understood, so the model seems to fit this scenario best.

The Second Epistle of Peter makes a comparison between false teachers and false prophets and how the former will bring in false teachings, just like the false prophets of old:

 "But false prophets also arose among the people, just as there will be false teachers among you, who will secretly bring in destructive heresies, even denying the Master who bought them, bringing upon themselves swift destruction. And many will follow their licentiousness, and because of them, the way of truth will be reviled. And in their greed they will exploit you with false words; from of old their condemnation has not been idle, and their destruction has not been asleep." (2 Peter )

The First Epistle of John warns those of the Christian faith to test every spirit because of these false prophets:

 "Beloved, do not believe every spirit, but test the spirits to see whether they are of God; for many false prophets have gone out into the world. By this, you know the Spirit of God: every spirit which confesses that Jesus Christ has come in the flesh is of God, and every spirit which does not confess Jesus is not of God. This is the spirit of antichrist, of which you heard that it was coming, and now it is in the world already." (1 John )

The false prophet of Revelation
The most well-known New Testament false prophet is the one mentioned in the Book of Revelation. The False Prophet is ultimately cast into the fiery lake with burning sulphur:

Another mention of a false prophet in the New Testament is the "antichrist spirit which denies the Son". In the New Testament, the word antichrist (Greek: antikhristos) appears mainly in the Johannine epistles and in the plural, denoting those who deny and/or don't believe in the messianship of Jesus. The similar word pseudochrist (Greek: pseudokhristos, meaning "false messiah") is used by Jesus in the Gospels. These terms seem to refer to a category of people rather than a single individual.

Islam

The Quran states that Muhammad is the "Seal of the Prophets" and Last and Final of the Prophets, which is understood by mainstream Sunni and Shīʿa Muslims to mean that anyone who claims to be a new prophet after him is a false prophet. All mainstream Muslim scholars' perspectives from both Sunni and Shīʿa denominations don't consider the Second Coming of ʿĪsā (Jesus) as the coming of a new prophet, since the Islamic Messiah had already been an existing prophet and will rule by the Quran and sunnah of Muhammad, bringing no new revelation or prophecy.

Thawban ibn Kaidad narrated that Muhammad said:

Abu Hurairah narrated that Muhammad said:

Muhammad also stated that the last of these dajjals would be the Antichrist, Al-Masih ad-Dajjal. The Dajjal is never mentioned in the Quran but he's mentioned and described in the ḥadīth literature. Like in Christianity, the Dajjal is said to emerge out in the east, although the specific location varies among the various sources. The Dajjal will imitate the miracles performed by ʿĪsā (Jesus), such as healing the sick and raising the dead, the latter done with the aid of demons (Shayāṭīn). He will deceive many people, such as weavers, magicians, half-castes, and children of prostitutes, but the majority of his followers will be Jews. According to the Islamic eschatological narrative, the events related to the final battle before the Day of Judgment will proceed in the following order:

Samra ibn Jundab reported that once Muhammad, while delivering a ceremonial speech at an occasion of a solar eclipse, said:

Anas ibn Malik narrated that Muhammad said:

Imam Mahdi (meaning "the rightly guided one") is the redeemer according to Islam. Just like the Dajjal, the Mahdi is never mentioned in the Quran but his description can be found in the ḥadīth literature; according to the Islamic eschatological narrative, he will appear on Earth before the Day of Judgment. At the time of the Second Coming of Christ, the prophet ʿĪsā shall return to defeat and kill al-Masih ad-Dajjal. Muslims believe that both ʿĪsā and the Mahdi will rid the world of wrongdoing, injustice, and tyranny, ensuring peace and tranquility. Eventually, the Dajjal will be killed by the Mahdi and ʿĪsā at the gate of Lud, who upon seeing Dajjal will cause him to slowly dissolve (like salt in water).

Judaism

Jesus is rejected in every branch of Judaism as a failed Jewish Messiah claimant and a false prophet.

"If a prophet, or one who foretells by dreams, appears among you and announces to you a miraculous sign or wonder, and if the sign or wonder of which he has spoken takes place, and he says, 'Let us follow other gods' (gods you have not known) 'and let us worship them,' you must not listen to the words of that prophet or dreamer. The Lord your God is testing you to find out whether you love him with all your heart and with all your soul. It is the Lord your God you must follow, and him you must revere. Keep his commands and obey him; serve him and hold fast to him. That prophet or dreamer must be put to death, because he preached rebellion against the Lord your God, who brought you out of Egypt and redeemed you from the land of slavery; he has tried to turn you from the way the Lord your God commanded you to follow. You must purge the evil from among you" (Deuteronomy ).

The Books of Kings records a story where, under duress from Ahab, the prophet Micaiah depicts God as requesting information from his heavenly counsel as to what he should do with a court of false prophets. This depiction is recorded in 1 Kings :
 "Micaiah continued, 'Therefore hear the word of the Lord: I saw the Lord sitting on his throne with all the host of heaven standing around him on his right and on his left.' And the Lord said, 'Who will entice Ahab into attacking Ramoth Gilead and going to his death there?'"
 "One suggested this, and another that. Finally, a spirit came forward, stood before the Lord and said, 'I will entice him.'"
 "'By what means?' the Lord asked."
 "'I will go out and be a lying spirit in the mouths of all his prophets,' he said."
 "'You will succeed in enticing him,' said the Lord. 'Go and do it.'"
 "So now the Lord has put a lying spirit in the mouths of all these prophets of yours. The Lord has decreed disaster for you".

It is possible that Micaiah meant to depict the false prophets as a test from YHWH. It is also possible that it was meant as a slur on Ahab's prophets, such as Zedekiah, the son of Chenaanah.

The penalty for false prophecy, including speaking in the name of a god other than YHWH or speaking presumptuously in YHWH's name, is death. Likewise, if a prophet makes a prophecy in the name of YHWH that does not come to pass, that is another sign that he is not commissioned of YHWH and that the people need not fear the false prophet.

The Jewish Koine Greek term pseudoprophetes occurs in the Septuagint (Jeremiah 6:13, 33:8-11, 34:9, 36:1-8, Zechariah 13:2); Flavius Josephus (Antiquities of the Jews 8-13-1, 10-7-3, The Jewish War 6-5-2); and Philo of Alexandria (Specific Laws 3:8). Classical Pagan writers used the term pseudomantis.

Use outside of religions
The term false prophet is sometimes applied outside religious usage, to describe promoters of scientific, medical, or political theories which the author of the phrase thinks are false. Paul Offit's 2008 book Autism's False Prophets applied the phrase to promoters of unproven theories and therapies such as the unsupported relationship between thiomersal and vaccines and chelation therapy. Ronald Bailey's 1993 book Ecoscam: The False Prophets of Ecological Apocalypse applied the phrase to promoters of the global warming hypothesis; however, by 2005 Bailey had changed his mind, writing "Anyone still holding onto the idea that there is no global warming ought to hang it up."

See also

 Apocalypticism
 Cult
 Deception
 False god
 Idolatry
 Jerusalem syndrome
 List of messiah claimants
 List of people claimed to be Jesus
 Messiah complex
 Messianic Age
 Millennialism
 Religious delusion
 True-believer syndrome
 Unfulfilled Christian religious predictions

References

Bibliography
 
 
 
 
 
 
 
 
 
 
 

Biblical phrases
Book of Revelation
Christian eschatology
Eschatology in the Bible
Negative Mitzvoth
Prophecy
Religious belief and doctrine
Sermon on the Mount